Khandeshwar is a railway station on the Harbour Line of the Mumbai Suburban Railway network.
In 2014, the City and Industrial Development Corporation (CIDCO) announced that it would set up an Inter State Bus Terminal on private-public participation at Khandeshwar Station. Khandeshwar railway station caters to New Panvel West but is built away from the city, while it is strategically near to Kamothe. The station derives its name from the  Khandeshwar Mahadev Mandir and Khandeshwar Lake and Park. As Khandeshwar Railway station adjoins the nearer Kamothe node the people from Kamothe prefer Khandeshwar station over Manasarowar railway station which is cornered in the Jui pVillage.

Gallery

References 

Railway stations in Raigad district
Mumbai Suburban Railway stations
Mumbai CR railway division